The 1980 New York Yankees season was the 78th season for the franchise. The team finished with a record of 103-59, finishing in first place in the American League East, 3 games ahead of the Baltimore Orioles. The Kansas City Royals swept the Yankees in the ALCS. New York was managed by Dick Howser. The Yankees played at Yankee Stadium.

Offseason 
 November 1, 1979: Chris Chambliss, Dámaso García, and Paul Mirabella were traded by the Yankees to the Toronto Blue Jays for Rick Cerone, Tom Underwood and Ted Wilborn.
 November 1, 1979: Jim Beattie, Rick Anderson, Juan Beníquez, and Jerry Narron were traded by the Yankees to the Seattle Mariners for Ruppert Jones and Jim Lewis.
 November 8, 1979: Bob Watson was signed as a free agent by the Yankees.
 November 8, 1979: Rudy May was signed as a free agent by the Yankees.
 November 14, 1979: The Yankees traded players to be named later and cash to the Texas Rangers for Eric Soderholm. The Yankees sent Amos Lewis (minors) and Ricky Burdette (minors) to the Rangers on December 13 to complete the trade.
 December 10, 1979: Andre Robertson was purchased by the Yankees from the Toronto Blue Jays.

Spring training 
The Yankees played two spring training exhibition games at the Louisiana Superdome over the weekend of March 15 and 16, 1980. 45,152 spectators watched the Yankees beat the Baltimore Orioles 9 to 3 on March 15, 1980. The following day, 43,339 fans saw Floyd Rayford lead the Orioles to a 7 to 1 win over the Yankees.

Regular season

Season standings

Record vs. opponents

Opening Day lineup

Notable transactions 
 April 1, 1980: Jim Kaat was signed as a free agent by the Yankees.
 April 4, 1980: Johnny Oates was signed as a free agent by the Yankees.
 April 30, 1980: Jim Kaat was purchased from the Yankees by the St. Louis Cardinals.
 May 28, 1980: Paul Blair was signed as a free agent by the Yankees.
 July 1, 1980: Paul Blair was released by the Yankees.
 August 1, 1980: José Rijo was signed by the Yankees as an amateur free agent.
 August 14, 1980: Ken Clay and a player to be named later were traded by the Yankees to the Texas Rangers for Gaylord Perry. The Yankees completed the deal by sending Marvin Thompson (minors) to the Rangers on October 1.

Roster

Game log

Regular season

|-

|-

|-

|- style="background:#bbcaff;"
| – || July 8 || ||colspan=10 |1980 Major League Baseball All-Star Game at Dodger Stadium in Los Angeles
|-

|-

|-

|-

|- style="text-align:center;"
| Legend:       = Win       = Loss       = PostponementBold = Yankees team member

Postseason Game log

|-

|- style="text-align:center;"
| Legend:       = Win       = LossBold = Yankees team member

Player stats

Batting

Starters by position 
Note: Pos = Position; G = Games played; AB = At bats; H = Hits; Avg. = Batting average; HR = Home runs; RBI = Runs batted in

Bold indicates American League All-Star.

Other batters 
Note: G = Games played; AB = At bats; H = Hits; Avg. = Batting average; HR = Home runs; RBI = Runs batted in

Pitching

Starting pitchers 
Note: G = Games pitched; IP = Innings pitched; W = Wins; L = Losses; ERA = Earned run average; SO = Strikeouts

Bold indicates American League All-Star.

Other pitchers 
Note: G = Games pitched; IP = Innings pitched; W = Wins; L = Losses; ERA = Earned run average; SO = Strikeouts

Relief pitchers 
Note: G = Games pitched; W = Wins; L = Losses; SV = Saves; ERA = Earned run average; SO = Strikeouts

ALCS

Game 1 
October 8 Royals Stadium

Game 2 
October 9 Royals Stadium

Game 3 
October 10 Yankee Stadium

Awards and honors 
Bucky Dent, Goose Gossage, Reggie Jackson, Tommy John, Graig Nettles and Willie Randolph represented the Yankees at the 1980 Major League Baseball All-Star Game.

Randolph earned the inaugural Silver Slugger Award at second base.

Farm system 

LEAGUE CHAMPIONS: Columbus, Fort Lauderdale, Greensboro, Oneonta, Paintsville

Notes

References 
1980 New York Yankees at Baseball Reference
1980 New York Yankees at Baseball Almanac

New York Yankees seasons
New York Yankees
New York Yankees
1980s in the Bronx
American League East champion seasons